Guidobaldo II della Rovere (2 April 1514 – 28 September 1574) was an Italian condottiero, who succeeded his father Francesco Maria I della Rovere as Duke of Urbino from 1538 until his death in 1574. He was a member of the House of La Rovere. Guidobaldo was an important patron of the arts in general, and of Titian in particular, commissioning his own portrait, and buying Titian's Venus of Urbino.

Early life 
Guidobaldo was the son of Francesco Maria I della Rovere and Eleonora Gonzaga. In 1535, despite a papal ban, he married Giulia da Varano, daughter of the duke of Camerino and Caterina Cybo.  In response to his marriage with Giulia, Pope Paul III excommunicated Guidobaldo, his bride, Giulia, his mother-in-law, Caterina Cybo, in 1535. Upon his installation as duke of Camerino, Paul III placed the duchy under interdict. Upon the assassination of his father, Guidobaldo became duke of Urbino in 1538.

Career

In 1546, he received a condotta as military leader (Governatore) by the Republic of Venice, for which his father had been a valiant commander during the Italian Wars. After the 1547 death of Giulia da Varano, in 1548 he married Vittoria Farnese - the daughter of Pier Luigi Farnese, Duke of Parma and Gerolama Orsini, daughter of Lodovico Orsini and wife and first cousin Giulia Conti. Later he was made Papal governor of Fano, receiving also the title of capitano generale (commander-in-chief) of the Papal States, as well as that of Prefect of Rome.

In 1559, he was hired by the King of Spain, helping Bernardo Sanseverino (who had married Isabella, one of Guidobaldo's daughters) in the war against the Ottoman Turks.

On 1 January 1573, a revolt rose against Guidobaldo in Urbino, due to the excessive tax burden that he was exerting over his state. He reacted by bloodily suppressing the riot.

Personal life
His additional children included:
 Francesco Maria II, who succeeded him as Duke of Urbino.
 Isabella, wife of Niccolò Bernardino Sanseverino, 6° Prince of Bisignano.
 Lavinia, married Alfonso Félix de Ávalos Aquino y Gonzaga, Marquis del Vasto.

After falling ill during a voyage to Ferrara and Pesaro, he died in the latter town in 1574.

Ancestry

References

Sources

1514 births
1574 deaths
Guidobaldo 2
People from Urbino
Guidobaldo 2
16th-century condottieri
16th-century Italian nobility
Captains General of the Church